Viktor Nosov may refer to:

 Victor Nosov (pilot) (1923–1945), Soviet war hero of World War II
 Viktor Nosov (footballer) (1940–2008), Ukrainian Soviet footballer and coach

See also
 Nosov